Shannon Bruce Snaith (born June 10, 1978), better known as Shane West, is an American actor, singer, and songwriter. He is known for his portrayal of Eli Sammler in the ABC family drama Once and Again, Landon Carter in A Walk to Remember, Dr. Ray Barnett in the NBC medical drama ER, Michael Bishop in The CW spy drama Nikita and in the WGN fantasy adventure historical drama Salem as John Alden. West received critical acclaim for his performance portraying Darby Crash in the biopic What We Do Is Secret.

As well as acting, West has performed with punk rock band the Germs, Jonny Was, and the Twilight Creeps.

Early life 
West was born in Baton Rouge, Louisiana, the son of Leah Catherine ( Launey), a lawyer, and Don Snaith, a drugstore owner. Both his parents were musicians and had their own punk bands. His mother is of Cajun French descent and his father was born in Jamaica, of British and Portuguese-Jewish origin. He is the eldest of three children with a sister Simone and a half-sister Marli Ann. His parents divorced in 1982 when he was four years old.  Influenced by his parents, he grew up listening to the Clash, the Jam, Blondie, Elvis Costello, and the Kinks. He said: "I always thought I would be doing music rather than acting."

At the age of ten, West and his sister Simone moved to Compton, California with their mother because she was looking for a better job. They later moved to Norwalk, California. Embarrassed by his feminine first name, West went by his middle name Bruce but changed his name to Shane West in High school when he took up acting. He struggled for two years and lived at his manager's house, before making his acting debut in 1995, appearing in the CBS drama Picket Fences in the season 4, episode 6 "Heart of Saturday Night", where he played Dave Lattimore.

Career

Acting 

In 1998, West guest-starred in several television series including Buffy the Vampire Slayer, and played Mark Tapper in the stage production of The Cider House Rules. He landed his first major role in 1999 in the ABC family drama Once and Again, playing Eli Sammler for three seasons. West's feature film debut was in Liberty Heights, a film about a Jewish family in Baltimore, directed by Barry Levinson. He also co-starred in teen comedies Whatever It Takes (2000) and Get Over It (2001).

West was cast as Landon Carter opposite singer and actress Mandy Moore in 2002's adaptation of Nicholas Sparks' novel A Walk to Remember. Roger Ebert of the Chicago Sun-Times found him "quietly convincing". His performance in the film earned him a Teen Choice Award for Choice Chemistry with Moore. He also appeared in the Mandy Moore music video "Cry". That year, West won the Young Hollywood Award Male Superstar of Tomorrow.

In 2003, West starred as an adult version of Mark Twain's Tom Sawyer in The League of Extraordinary Gentlemen alongside Sean Connery.  A year later, he joined the cast of the NBC medical drama, ER in the eleventh-season premiere, playing resident Ray Barnett. In May 2007, West left ER at the end of the thirteenth season after winning a role in Supreme Courtships, but the series was not picked up by the Fox Network. In October 2008, West returned to ER for three episodes during its fifteenth and final season.

During hiatus between seasons of ER, West worked on shooting What We Do Is Secret, an independent film, which premiered at the 2007 Los Angeles Film Festival after much delay. West helped to finance it. In the film, he portrays Darby Crash, a member of the 1970s punk band the Germs. Members of the band were so impressed by West's performance that they re-formed the band with West taking the deceased Crash's place. West received positive reviews for his portrayal in the movie; the San Francisco Chronicle stated that he is the one who "lifts the entire film to a whole other level". Similarly, The Seattle Times wrote that his impersonation was "worth saluting" while TV Guide called it "pretty impressive". In 2008, he received the Rising Star Award in Philadelphia Film Festival for his work in What We Do is Secret.

West starred as Michael Bishop in The CW spy drama Nikita from 2010 to 2013. In 2014, he began starring in the WGN America adventure/historical/fantasy drama Salem as John Alden for three seasons before the show ended in 2017.

West starred in post-apocalyptic film, Here Alone which premiered at the 2016 Tribeca Film Festival and was released theatrically on March 30, 2017. The film received the Audience Award at the 2016 Tribeca Film Festival

In 2018, West was cast as Eduardo Dorrance in the fifth and final season of Gotham. In November 2018, it was revealed that West will portray the role of Billy Millikin in upcoming feature film Gossamer Folds.  In November 2019 it was announced that West will star in the upcoming sci-fi thriller No Running.

Music 

West was the lead singer of punk rock band Jonny Was for "seven or eight years". The band was originally known as Average Joe but had to change its name for legal reasons. The band contributed to the A Walk to Remember soundtrack, appearing under the names "West, Gould, and Fitzgerald" because they had not yet decided on a new name. West described their style as "a pop-punk-type band, more Green Day-ish".

In November 2005, while What We Do Is Secret was still in production, it was announced that West would be fronting the Germs on tour. He performed with the band for nearly five years, doing an American tour (including the 2006 Warped Tour) and a European Tour. He described the experience as "more exciting" than acting. However, after booking a leading role in Nikita, West had less time to play with the band. His last performance was in December 2009.

In 2015, West reunited with some of his old bandmates from Jonny Was to form a new band called the Twilight Creeps. In October 2016, they released their debut album. In January 2019, they announced they are releasing their second album on February 1. In December of 2020, the Twilight Creeps released their first Christmas song entitled "Poison in the Mistletoe".

Personal life 
West is a sports enthusiast and avid supporter of the New Orleans Saints and LSU Tigers football teams. In 2019 he lent his voice to some of the team's pre-season videos. He lived in Toronto, Canada for six years during the filming of the series Nikita.

Filmography

Film

Television

Music videos

Awards

References

External links 

 
 
 Twilight Creeps

1978 births
American people of British descent
American people of French descent
American people of Jamaican descent
American people of Portuguese descent
20th-century American male actors
21st-century American male actors
Male actors from California
American male film actors
American punk rock singers
American male television actors
Germs (band) members
Male actors from Baton Rouge, Louisiana
Cajun people
Living people
21st-century American singers